The New Woman is the third of four major novels by the Polish writer Bolesław Prus. It was composed, and appeared in newspaper serialization, in 1890-93, and dealt with societal questions involving feminism.

History
The New Woman, written in 1890–93, first appeared serially in the Warsaw Kurier Codzienny (Daily Courier). Its first book publication followed in 1894.

Characters

Main

Magdalena Brzeska
Emma Latter 
Ada Solska
Stefan Solski
Helena Norska
Kazimierz Norski

Film
In 1982, the novel was adapted as a Polish feature film, Pensja Pani Latter (Mrs. Latter's Boarding School).

See also

List of feminist literature

Notes

References
Czesław Miłosz, The History of Polish Literature, New York, Macmillan, 1969.
Edward Pieścikowski, Bolesław Prus, 2nd edition, Warsaw, Państwowe Wydawnictwo Naukowe, 1985.
Zygmunt Szweykowski, Twórczość Bolesława Prusa (The Art of Bolesław Prus), 2nd edition, Warsaw, Państwowy Instytut Wydawniczy, 1972.

Further reading
Bolesław Prus, Emancipated Women, translated from Prus' Emancypantki by Stephanie Kraft, 2015:  available at [emancypantki.net] and as an ebook and print book through Amazon.com, Barnes & Noble, and Kobo.

1893 novels
Novels by Bolesław Prus
Feminist fiction
Novels first published in serial form
Polish novels
Works originally published in Polish newspapers
19th-century Polish novels
Polish novels adapted into films